The FIL World Luge Championships 2005 took place in Park City, Utah, United States.

Men's singles

Source:

Women's singles

Men's doubles

Mixed team

Medal table

References
 Men's doubles World Champions
 Men's singles World Champions
 Mixed teams World Champions
 Women's singles World Champions
 World Cup Champs, Park City, Utah, USA, February 18-20, 2005

FIL World Luge Championships
International luge competitions hosted by the United States
2005 in luge
2005 in American sports